Edward Keyes may refer to:

 Edward J. Keyes (1859–1929), member of the Wisconsin State Assembly
 Edward Lawrence Keyes (1843–1924), American urologist
 Edward L. Keyes (politician) (c. 1812–1859), Massachusetts politician